St Peter's and St Andrew's Church is located on Princes Street in Thurso, Caithness, Scotland. The church was built to a design of William Burn in 1830–2, a simplified version of the Church of St John the Evangelist, Edinburgh, which is also attributed to Burn.

References

External links

Thurso
Churches in Highland (council area)
Churches completed in 1832
1832 establishments in Scotland